Dakahwa is a village in West Champaran district in the Indian state of Bihar.

Demographics
As of 2011 India census, Dakahwa had a population of 969 in 205 households. Males constitute 52.1% of the population and females 47.8%. Dakahwa has an average literacy rate of 31.47%, lower than the national average of 74%: male literacy is 67.54%, and female literacy is 32.45%. In Dakahwa, 20% of the population is under 6 years of age.

References

Villages in West Champaran district